Virginia's 7th congressional district is a United States congressional district in the Commonwealth of Virginia. The district is currently represented by Democrat Abigail Spanberger, first elected in 2018.

Recent election results

2000s

2010s

2020s

Recent results in statewide elections 
Results Under Current Lines (Since 2023)

Results Under Old Lines

Geography
The district spans across much of Central and Northern Virginia including all of Orange, Culpeper, Spotsylvania, Greene County, Madison County, Fredericksburg, Caroline County, King George County, Stafford County, and the eastern half of  Prince William County, and a small sliver of Albemarle County.

Prior to 1993, the 7th District stretched from the fringes of the Washington, D.C. suburbs to Charlottesville. Until the 1970s, it included most of the Shenandoah Valley. After the 1970 Census, it lost most of the Valley except for Winchester, while picking up Manassas and Fredericksburg. The district's current configuration dates from 1993, when Virginia was forced to create a majority-minority district by a Justice Department directive. At that time, most of Richmond, which had been entirely in the old 3rd District for over a century, was shifted to a newly created 3rd District. The remaining territory in the old 3rd was combined with some more rural areas to the north to form the new 7th District.

From 2013 to 2017, the 7th District stretched from the west end of Richmond through the wealthier portions of Henrico and Chesterfield counties before taking in all of Goochland, Hanover, Louisa, New Kent, Orange, Culpeper, Page and Rappahannock counties and a portion of Spotsylvania County. In 2016, the adjacent 3rd district was found unconstitutional, leading to court-ordered redistricting which changed the 7th District for the 2016 elections.

From 2017-2023, the district spanned across much of Central Virginia including all of Orange, Culpeper, Goochland, Louisa, Nottoway, Amelia, and Powhatan counties. The district also included large portions of Chesterfield and Henrico counties in the suburbs of Richmond. However, Richmond was not in the 7th. Spotsylvania County also had a large portion in the 7th district just outside of Fredericksburg.

Demographics
According to the United States Census Bureau's 2017 data for Virginia's 7th Congressional District, the total population of the district is 790,084.  Median age for the district is 39.7 years. 65.5% of the district is Non-Hispanic White, 18.4% Black, 5.1% Asian, 0.3% Native American or Alaskan, and 3.4% some other race with 7.3% Hispanic or Latino. Owner-occupied housing is 73.0% and renter-occupied housing is 27.0%. The median value of single-family owner-occupied homes is $266,500. 91.6% of the district population has at least a high school diploma, 40.4% at least a bachelor's degree or higher. 9.1% of the district are civilian veterans. 9.1% are foreign born and 11.9% speak a language other than English at home. 9.9% are of disability status. 68.2% of the district is in the labor force, which consists of those 16 years and older. Mean travel time to work is 29.3 minutes. Median household income is $77,533. Per capita income is $37,567. 5.3% of the population account for families living below the poverty level, and 7.7% of individuals live below the poverty level. 9.5% of Children live below the poverty line.

List of members representing the district

Historical district boundaries

See also

Virginia's congressional districts
List of United States congressional districts

References

 Congressional Biographical Directory of the United States 1774–present

07
Caroline County, Virginia
Government in Chesterfield County, Virginia
Culpeper County, Virginia
Goochland County, Virginia
Hanover County, Virginia
Government in Henrico County, Virginia
Louisa County, Virginia
Madison County, Virginia
Orange County, Virginia
Page County, Virginia
Rappahannock County, Virginia
Richmond, Virginia
Spotsylvania County, Virginia
Constituencies established in 1789
1789 establishments in Virginia
Constituencies disestablished in 1933
1933 disestablishments in Virginia
Constituencies established in 1935
1935 establishments in Virginia